De Dijk (English: The Dike) is a Dutch rock band which formed in 1981. The band is named after Zeedijk, a street in their hometown Amsterdam. Their music can be described as a mixture of soul, blues and rock 'n roll, with lyrics sung only in Dutch, except for their 2010 album Hold On Tight; the song 'Enough is Enough', both of which are sung in English by Solomon Burke; and Stupid Guy from the album Wakker in een vreemde wereld, performed in English by the regular band.

De Dijk was formed by Huub van der Lubbe, who also is an actor and poet, his brother Hans van der Lubbe and Nico Arzbach. The band started in a time when Dutch language pop music became highly popular, with bands like Doe Maar, Het Goede Doel and Toontje Lager. Van der Lubbe performs as a poet as well. Perhaps as a consequence, the band is not only popular with teenagers but also with older people. During the 1990s, songs of De Dijk were a major source of inspiration for upcoming Dutch bands like Van Dik Hout and Bløf.

On June 1, 2022, Huub van der Lubbe announced that De Dijk will disband after their fall-tour.

Members
Today De Dijk are:
 Huub van der Lubbe (vocals)
 Hans van der Lubbe (bass guitar)
 Nico Arzbach (guitar)
 Antonie Broek (drums & production)
 Pim Kops (keyboards, accordion, guitar)

On stage they are accompanied by:
 Roland Brunt (saxophone)
 Peter van Soest (trumpet)
 Jelle Broek (guitar)

Former members:
 JB Meijers (guitar)

Discography
De Dijk (1982) – The Dike
Nooit meer Tarzan (1983) – No More Tarzan
Elke dag een nieuwe hoed (1985) – Each Day a New Hat	
Wakker in een vreemde wereld (1987) – Awake in a Strange World
Niemand in de stad (1989) – Nobody in Town
Live (1990) – Live
Nooit genoeg (1991) – Never Enough
Zeven levens (1992) – Seven Lives
De blauwe schuit (1994) – The Blue Barge
De stand van de maan (1997) – The Position of the Moon
Voor de tover (1998) – For the Magic
Het beste van (1998) – The Best of
Zevende hemel (2000) – Seventh Heaven
Muzikanten dansen niet (2002) – Musicians Don't Dance
Door (2003) – Onward
Later is nu (2005) – Later Is Now
Zullen we dansen (2006) – Shall We Dance
We beginnen pas (2006) – We Have Just Started
Brussel (2008) – Brussels
Hold On Tight (2010, collaboration with Solomon Burke)
Scherp de Zeis (2011) – Sharpen the Scythe
Allemansplein (2014) – Everyman's Square
Groef (2017) – Groove
Nu of Nou (2019) – Now or Currently

Awards
 1987 – Zilveren Harp (Silver Harp) – Most promising new Dutch act
 1993 – Gouden Harp (Golden Harp) – For their large contribution to Dutch music
 1995 – Edison Music Award – Best Dutch rock album (De Blauwe Schuit)
 2005 – Edison Music Award – For their entire work
 2008 – Popprijs (Pop Prize) – For the album Brussels (and for their entire work)

References

External links
 De Dijk (official website)
 De Dijk biography at the Encyclopedia of Dutch Rock Music
 Solomon Burke & De Dijk

Musical groups established in 1981
Dutch rock music groups
Musical groups from Amsterdam